William Ruger (died May 21, 1843) was an American lawyer and politician from New York.

Life
About 1828, he opened a select school in Watertown, New York, and taught mathematics there. He published A New System of Arithmeticks (on-line copy; 1836; 264 pages). He also studied law, and was admitted to the bar in 1831. He practiced law in partnership with Charles Mason from 1835 to 1838.

Ruger was a member of the New York State Senate (5th D.) in 1842 and 1843.

Chief Judge William C. Ruger (1824–1892) was his nephew.

Sources
The New York Civil List compiled by Franklin Benjamin Hough (pages 133f and 145; Weed, Parsons and Co., 1858)

Year of birth unknown
1843 deaths
Democratic Party New York (state) state senators
Politicians from Watertown, New York